Zhenshang Town is an urban town in Xinhua County, Hunan Province, People's Republic of China.

Administrative division
The town is divided into 71 villages and one community, the following areas: 
 
  Daqiao Community
  Chucai Village
  Zhenshang Village
  Shantang Village
  Jiuda Village
  Shenxian Village
  Xiangrong Village
  Fangronghua Village
  Yongsheng Village
  Fangjiawan Village
  Wenjiao Village
  Fangmaping Village
  Pingshan Village
  Ganjia Village
  Tieshichong Village
  Liunanshan Village
  Dongjiang Village
  Shutang Village
  Taiyuan Village
  Xinquan Village
  Fengjia Village
  Zhizi Village
  Shanxi Village
  Youyu Village
  Xiangjia Village
  Dingxin Village
  Xinsheng Village
  Tuoshan Village
  Huilong Village
  Zaoxi Village
  Dazhu Village
  Santian Village
  Luxi Village
  Zhuzi Village
  Xiejia Village
  Dongxi Village
  Shuangjiang Village
  Hemu Village
  Hainan Village
  Shanshan Village
  Yanxi Village
  Liujia Village
  Liuzhong Village
  Shizhong Village
  Fengjia Village
  Tanshan Village
  Aotang Village
  Jintang Village
  Longju Village
  Yonglong Village
  Huangxi Village
  Liming Village
  Nanhua Village
  Tongzi Village
  Songshan Village
  Chizhu Village
  Jinzhu Village
  Xiejiabai Village
  Baimao Village
  Renhe Village
  Zhongru Village
  Shancha Village
  Jinlu Village
  Chenjiawan Village
  Zhonglu Village
  Shuguang Village
  Banshan Village
  Dongyi Village
  Jiangxia Village
  Xujia Village
  Pingyun Village
  Dongsheng Village

References

External links

Divisions of Xinhua County